Perriers-la-Campagne is a former commune in the Eure department in Normandy in northern France. On 1 January 2017, it was merged into the new commune Nassandres sur Risle.

History
The Japanese prince Prince Naruhisa Kitashirakawa died there in a car accident in 1923.

Population

See also
Communes of the Eure department

References

Former communes of Eure